In social anthropology, a sodality is a non-kin group organized for a specific purpose (economic, cultural, or other), and frequently spanning villages or towns. 

Sodalities are often based on common age or gender, with all-male sodalities more common than all-female. One aspect of a sodality is that of a group "representing a certain level of achievement in the society, much like the stages of an undergraduate's progress through college [university]".  

In the anthropological literature, the Mafia in Sicily has been described as a sodality. Other examples include Maasai war camps, and Crow and Cheyenne military associations, groups that were not much unlike today's Veterans of Foreign Wars or American Legion.

The term was first used with this meaning by Elman Service (no doubt drawing on the sodality vs. modality distinction used in some Christian churches), as part of his band-tribe-chiefdom-state model for the progression of political integration. It defined an organization that occurred across bands, and therefore was a part of a tribe, rather than a band, which was composed of only kin.

Arjun Appadurai uses the concept of sodalities to describe what he views as the collective, cultural dimension and function of the imagination given the globalization of electronic mass media and transnational migration. For Appadurai, sodalities, much like what he terms "localities" or "neighborhoods", are cultural groups or spaces that mediate globalized cultural flows and, importantly, create possibilities for "translocal social action that would otherwise be hard to imagine" (p.8). In other words, sodalities are generative social spaces for agency, imagination, and social action.

See also
Pantribal sodalities
Secret society

References

See also
Social anthropology

Anthropology

de:Sodalität

Social anthropology
Sociological terminology